The following is a list of presidents of France sorted by length of tenure.

List

By Republic

French Second Republic (1848–1852)

French Third Republic (1870–1940)

French Fourth Republic (1946–1958)

French Fifth Republic (1958–present)

Interim President

 Alain Poher, as President of the Senate was called on to serve as Interim President of France in April–June 1969 and April–May 1974.

See also
 List of presidents of France

Notes

References

French, President
French republic
Presidents
Presidents
de:Liste der Staatsoberhäupter Frankreichs#Zweite Republik